Ken Worden (2 February 1943 – 20 September 2021) was an English-born football coach and a player.

Worden was born on 2 February 1943, in Preston, Lancashire, England. 

Worden was more successful in Australia as player and coach, notably as head coach at national level with Melbourne Croatia, where he guided the club to a runners-up place in the 1990–91 season, losing the grand final to local rivals South Melbourne.

Worden also coached at Southeast Asia, coaching clubs in Malaysia and Myanmar, and also had stints as head coach of national teams of Malaysia and Singapore.

Worden died on 20 September 2021 in Australia, at the age of 78.

References

External links
chedinsphere: Perlawanan Akhir Piala FA 1991 (Selangor vs Perak)
Stats at Ozfootball.net

1943 births
2021 deaths
Australian soccer coaches
English footballers
English football managers
Singapore national football team managers
Burnley F.C. players
Preston North End F.C. players
Launceston City FC players
Townsville Kern United players
Malaysia national football team managers
Sabah F.C. (Malaysia) managers
Association football defenders
Association football forwards
Southern Myanmar F.C. managers
Footballers from Preston, Lancashire